Spilotragus crucifer is a species of beetle in the family Cerambycidae. It was described by Per Olof Christopher Aurivillius in 1908. It is known from Somalia and Kenya.

References

Tragocephalini
Beetles described in 1908